Malcolm Andrew Ferguson-Smith,  (born 5 September 1931) is a British geneticist.

Early life and education
Ferguson-Smith was born in Glasgow in 1931, the son of physician John Ferguson-Smith and educated at Stowe School. He graduated from the University of Glasgow in 1955 with a Bachelor of Medicine, Bachelor of Surgery degree.

Career and research
In 1955–1956 he was House Physician and House Surgeon at the Western Infirmary in Glasgow and in 1956–1958 Senior House Officer (SHO) and Registrar in Pathology.

Johns Hopkins
In 1959 he was appointed a Fellow in Medicine at the School of Medicine, Johns Hopkins University, Baltimore where he worked on chromosome analysis for nearly three years, establishing the first human chromosome diagnostic laboratory in the USA.

Return to Glasgow
In 1961 he returned to the Department of Genetics at the University of Glasgow and was appointed successively Lecturer, Senior Lecturer and Reader, becoming the first Burton Professor of Medical Genetics in 1973. Apart from teaching genetics to medical students his duties involved the establishment of a Regional Genetics Service for the West of Scotland. This provided opportunities for contributing to the human gene map using familial chromosome polymorphisms, deletion mapping, in situ hybridisation and chromosome sorting by flow cytometry. His work on mapping the Y-linked sex determinant in XX males led to the isolation of the mammalian sex-determining gene twenty-five years later.

Gene mapping
In 1987 he was appointed Professor and Head of the Department of Pathology at University of Cambridge and Director of the East Anglia Regional Genetics Service, where he furthered his research on gene mapping. He retired as Head of Pathology in 1998 and moved to the University Department of Veterinary Medicine.  In 2002 he established the Cambridge Resource Centre for Comparative Genomics which produced and distributed chromosome-specific DNA from over 120 species of animals, birds and fish to scientists worldwide for research in biology, evolution and gene mapping. This data allowed comparisons between species to be made and mapped, illuminating the relationships between species and allowing research into genomic evolution.

Publications
 Translocation of c-abl oncogene in chronic myelocytic leukaemia
 Early Prenatal Diagnosis (1983)
 Prenatal Diagnosis & Screening (1992)
 Essential Medical Genetics (5 edn, 1997)

Awards and honours
In 1998 he was appointed as the scientist member of Lord Phillips' Committee to review the UK Government's original Bovine Spongiform Encephalopathy (BSE) inquiry and consider the emergence of BSE and new variant Creutzfeldt–Jakob disease (CJD) and the actions taken, reporting in 2000.

He was elected Fellow of the Royal Society of Edinburgh (FRSE) in 1978 and a Fellow of the Royal Society (FRS) in 1983. His papers are held at University of Glasgow.

Personal life
He is the father of Anne Ferguson-Smith, Arthur Balfour Professor of Genetics in Cambridge.

References

External links 

 

1931 births
Academics from Glasgow
Fellows of Peterhouse, Cambridge
Fellows of the Royal Society of Edinburgh
Fellows of the Royal Society
Living people
Alumni of the University of Glasgow
Scientists from Glasgow
Scottish geneticists
People educated at Stowe School